Port of Khasab is situated in the Musandam Governorate of Oman.

References

Transport in Oman
Ports and harbours of Oman